Peckoltia relictum is a species of armored catfish where it is found in the upper Marañon River in northern Peru.

References

Loricariidae
Fish of Peru
Fish described in 2011